Don't Think I've Forgotten: Cambodia’s Lost Rock and Roll is a 2014 documentary film, directed by John Pirozzi, about Cambodian rock music in the 1960s and 1970s, before the Khmer Rouge regime and Cambodian genocide.

Production
The idea for the film began when American filmmaker John Pirozzi was in Cambodia filming City of Ghosts. He was given a copy of the album Cambodian Rocks, a collection of untitled and uncredited music by artists presumed killed under the Khmer Rouge, and began researching the stories of the artists. Cambodian-born artist and sociology professor Linda Saphan acted as associate producer and lead researcher for the film. The film includes profiles of influential performers like Sinn Sisamouth, Ros Serey Sothea, Pen Ran, Baksey Cham Krong, Liev Tuk, Huoy Meas, Yol Aularong, Meas Samon, Pou Vannary, and several others (including Pen Ram, Pen Ran's sister), most of whom perished during the Khmer Rouge genocide, plus interviews with surviving performers like Sieng Vanthy and members of Drakkar. The film takes its title from a song by Sinn Sisamouth.

Reception
Don't Think I've Forgotten holds a rare 100% rating out of 22 reviews on Rotten Tomatoes with a 7.46/10 average critic rating. On Metacritic the film has a score of 79 out of 100 based on reviews from 8 critics, indicating "Generally favorable reviews." Film reviewer A.O. Scott of The New York Times mentions in short that, "Mr. Pirozzi’s film is an unsparing and meticulous reckoning of the effects of tyranny on ordinary Cambodians. It is also a rich and defiant effort at recovery, showing that even the most murderous totalitarianism cannot fully erase the human drive for pleasure and self-expression."

Soundtrack 

The soundtrack to Don't Think I've Forgotten, featuring full versions of several songs that appeared as snippets in the film, was released on 12 May 2015. Personnel at Dust-to-Digital helped locate original versions of the songs and remaster them for compact disc.

Track listing
Note: Blank entries below indicate unknown information. The song "There's Nothing to Be Ashamed Of" (track 8) by Pen Ran is also known as "Love Like Honey" on other compilation albums. Additional songs may have slightly different English titles in other compilations due to the difficulties of translation from their original Khmer titles. The song "Dying Under the Woman's Sword" (track 14) is credited on this soundtrack to Yol Aularong and Va Savoy, but on the Cambodian Rocks compilation it is credited to Aularong and Liev Tuk.

References

External links
 
 
 

Documentaries about music
2015 films
2014 documentary films
American documentary films
Documentary films about Cambodia
Documentary films about the Cambodian genocide
Rockumentaries
Cambodian music
2010s American films